Eight vessels of the Royal Navy have been named HMS Beagle, after a dog breed. The most notable of these ships is the second , 1820–1870, which transported Charles Darwin around the world in the voyage of Beagle.

 , a 10-gun , launched in 1820 and converted to a survey ship in 1825. After her famous voyage with Charles Darwin, she became a customs watch vessel in 1846, and was sold in 1870.
 , an  wooden-hulled screw gunvessel launched in 1854 and sold in 1863, eventually becoming the Japanese vessel Kanko
 , a 1-gun schooner serving in Sydney from 1872 to 1883.
 , a  steel screw sloop, the lead ship of a class of two, in service from 1889 to 1905.
 , a  launched in 1930 and broken up in 1946.
 , a  hydrographic survey ship launched in 1967 and sold in 2002.

Also, in 1766, the  Bombay Marine, which was the British East India Company's navy, had a gallivat named Beagle that was armed with eight 3-pounder guns.

Battle honours
Ships named Beagle have earned the following battle honours:
Basque Roads, 1809
San Sebastian, 1813
Crimea, 1854−55
China, 1856−60
Dardanelles, 1915−16
Norway, 1940
Atlantic, 1940−43, 1945
North Africa, 1942
Arctic, 1942−44
English Channel, 1943
Normandy, 1944

See also 
 Beagle 2, a failed British Mars lander that arrived at Mars in 2003 
 Beagle 3, a proposed Mars lander mission to search for life on Mars

References

Royal Navy ship names

fi:HMS Beagle